Neobathyclupea is a genus of fish in the family Bathyclupeidae found in the Atlantic, Indian and Pacific Ocean.

Species
There are currently 7 recognized species in this genus:
 Neobathyclupea argentea (Goode & T. H. Bean, 1896) (West Atlantic deep-sea herring)
 Neobathyclupea elongata (Trunov, 1975) (Slender deep-sea herring)
 Neobathyclupea gracilis (Fowler, 1938) (West Pacific deep-sea herring)
 Neobathyclupea japanotaiwana (Prokofiev, 2014) (North Pacific deep-sea herring) 
 Neobathyclupea malayana (M. C. W. Weber, 1913) (Malaysian deep-sea herring) 
 Neobathyclupea megaceps (Fowler, 1938) (Big-headed deep-sea herring)
 Neobathyclupea melanoptera Prokofiev, Gon & Psomadakis, 2016

References

Bathyclupeidae
Taxa named by Artem Mikhailovich Prokofiev